The Andhra cricket team is an Indian domestic cricket team representing the South India state of Andhra Pradesh. The team's main home ground is Dr. Y. S. Rajasekhara Reddy International Cricket Stadium at Visakhapatnam, while some home matches are also played at Anantapur and Kadapa.

Overview 
The roots of organisation can be traced to the formation of the Guntur Recreation Club in 1951 which was affiliated to the Madras Cricket Association. The Andhra Cricket Association was eventually formed in 1953. Andhra competed in the Ranji Trophy for the first time in the 1953–54 season, captained by C. K. Nayudu, who scored the team's first fifty in that match. Andhra has competed in every Ranji Trophy season since, with the exception of 1961–62, when it was absent. It falls under the South Zone of Indian cricket.

After the 2019–20 season Andhra had played 326 first-class matches, with 50 wins, 132 losses and 144 draws. In List A cricket, Andhra had played 148 matches, with 49 wins, 97 losses and two no-results.

Andhra has never featured in a Ranji Trophy final and has therefore never had a chance to participate in the Irani Trophy. In the 2007/08 season Andhra, captained by Mannava Prasad, achieved two wins out of six in the Elite Group of the Ranji Trophy, missing out of the semi-finals. In February 2018, they reached the semi-finals of the 2017–18 Vijay Hazare Trophy, the first time the team had got to that stage of the Vijay Hazare Trophy. In 2019-20 Andhra reached the Ranji Trophy quarter-finals, losing to Saurashtra, who went on to win the trophy.

Notable players 

Players from Andhra Pradesh who have played Test cricket for India, along with year of Test debut:
 Mannava Sri Kanth Prasad (1999)
 Hanuma Vihari (2018)
 K. S. Bharat (2023)

Players from Andhra Pradesh who have played ODI but not Test cricket for India, along with year of ODI debut :
 Yalaka Venugopal Rao (2005)

Current squad 
Players with international caps are listed in bold.

Updated as on 31 January 2023

Coaching staff
 Director Of Cricket Operations- Venugopal Rao
 Head coach - Charles Thomson
 Assistant coach - Hemal Watekar
 Assistant coach - Venkata Appa Rao
 Fielding Coach - Subhadeep Ghosh

References

External links 
 Andhra Cricket Association website
 Andhra at CricketArchive

Indian first-class cricket teams
Cricket in Andhra Pradesh
1953 establishments in India
Cricket clubs established in 1953